Roam Sweet Home is a 1996 American documentary film directed by Ellen Spiro. In road-trip style, it follows the lives of retirees who live on the road full-time in trailers, due to economic necessity, pleasure, or bot.

Premise 
Filmmaker Spiro and her dog, Sam, join a community of American nomads in order to explore their unconventional lifestyle first hand. Through Spiro's innovative and interpersonal style of filmmaking she captures the spirit of the roamers and the wide variety of reasons they abandoned the more traditional means of retirement.  One group of women discusses the thrill of independence and sheer freedom they discovered after escaping repressive relationships.  Another expounds upon the pleasures of traveling unencumbered throughout the country.

The film is narrated by Spiro's dog, Sam, with the voice provided by Allan Gurganus, who shares his perspective on the whims and follies of human nature.  Aging himself, Sam adds an emotional perspective through his musings on death and the journey through life.

Awards 
 Grand Prize at the Big Muddy Film Festival
 National Media Owl award presented by Gene Siskel for the Retirement Research Foundation

References 
Johnson, Jerry.   Roam Sweet Home.   Austin Chronicle.  1997-11-7.  Retrieved on 2007-6-12.
McDonald, Scott.   The Garden in the Machine: A Field Guide to Independent Films About Place.  University of California Press.  Berkeley and Los Angeles California.  2001.  Retrieved on 2007-6-25.  
 Roam Sweet Home: ITVS presents Ellen Spiro's Inside Look at Life on the Road. Independent Television Service.  1997-5-28.  Retrieved on 2007-6-12.		
 Independent Television Service (ITVS): Press Release.  1997-5-28. Retrieved on 2007-6-12.

External links 
  Roam Sweet Home Official Website	
 

1996 films
American documentary films
Documentary films about old age
Films directed by Ellen Spiro
Documentary films about road transport
1990s English-language films
1990s American films